Pablo Ezequiel Vegetti Pfaffen (born 15 October 1988) is an Argentine professional footballer, who plays as a forward for Club Atlético Belgrano of the Primera Nacional.

Career
Vegetti started his professional career playing for Club Colón de San Justo of the Liga Santafesina de Fútbol. After scoring 33 goals in 40 games, he signed for Villa San Carlos, playing in the Primera B Metropolitana. He scored 24 goals for Villa San Carlos, helping the team to gain promotion to Primera B Nacional, the second tier of Argentina's professional soccer.

In August 2013, he signed for Rangers, which bought 50% of his economic rights. After a mediocre performance in the Chilean team, in February 2014, he was loaned to Ferro Carril Oeste to play in the Primera B Nacional. He scored six goals in 20 games for Ferro. When he had everything set up to re-sign with Ferro, he unexpectedly signed for Gimnasia y Esgrima de La Plata. Technically, he was on loan to Gimnasia from Rangers for 18 months.

External links
 
 

1988 births
Living people
Argentine footballers
Argentine expatriate footballers
Association football forwards
Footballers from Santa Fe, Argentina
Primera Nacional players
Primera B Metropolitana players
Ferro Carril Oeste footballers
Rangers de Talca footballers
Club de Gimnasia y Esgrima La Plata footballers
Club Atlético Colón footballers
Boca Unidos footballers
Instituto footballers
Club Atlético Belgrano footballers
Chilean Primera División players
Expatriate footballers in Chile
Argentine expatriate sportspeople in Chile